Nikhom Phatthana may refer to:

Nikhom Phatthana District
Nikhom Phatthana Subdistrict, Nong Bua Lamphu
Nikhom Phatthana Subdistrict, Lampang
Nikhom Phatthana Subdistrict, Phitsanulok
Nikhom Phatthana Subdistrict, Rayong
Nikhom Phatthana Subdistrict, Satun
Nikhom Phatthana Subdistrict, Sisaket